Yatim Aghli (also Romanized as Yatīm Āghlī and Yatīm Āgholī; also known as Atamkolī, Etmagli, Etmakli, and Yatīm Āqolī) is a village in Hajjilar-e Shomali Rural District, Hajjilar District, Chaypareh County, West Azerbaijan Province, Iran. At the 2006 census, its population was 114, in 30 families.

References 

Populated places in Chaypareh County